Tigran Karapeti Karapetyan (16 May 1945 – 21 October 2021) was an Armenian politician and the chairman of the People's Party. He was also the owner of a private television company named ALM which operated from 2002 to 2011.

Karapetyan was the founder of a small, populist political party which he founded after making his fortune in Russia. He appeared on his television station on a daily basis and his "folksy demeanour" was popular with working class and rural Armenians.

Tigran Karapetyan lost elections and announced his disappointment of people in an incident in 2011 in Yerevan. He was popular for his charities to people of vulnerable groups. He was the author of a popular song "flowers" (ծաղիկներ), which he sang live on his own TV. 

He died of Coronavirus aged 76.

Links
 ePress.am article

References

1945 births
2021 deaths
Armenian businesspeople
Armenian politicians
People's Party (Armenia) politicians
People from Yerevan